Peter Stephen Du Ponceau (born Pierre-Étienne du Ponceau, June 3, 1760 – April 1, 1844) was a French-American linguist, philosopher, and jurist.  After emigrating to the colonies in 1777, he served in the American Revolutionary War. Afterward, he settled in Philadelphia, where he lived the remainder of his years. He contributed significantly to work on the indigenous languages of the Americas, as well as advancing the understanding of written Chinese.

Early life
Du Ponceau's fondness for languages began when he was six. He studied at a Benedictine college until he abruptly ended his education, after only 18 months, over a dissatisfaction with the scholarly philosophy taught there. When he was 17, he emigrated to America in 1777 with Baron von Steuben, who was 30 years older.

War service
Du Ponceau served as a secretary to Steuben in the Continental Army during the American Revolution. After the war, he settled in Philadelphia, where he spent the rest of his life. Among his acquaintances were many important figures of the American Revolution, including Alexander Hamilton, John Laurens, Lafayette and James Monroe.

Work in philosophy and linguistics
Du Ponceau joined the American Philosophical Society in 1791 and served as its vice president from 1816 until he became president in 1828, a position he held until his death. He became notable in linguistics for his analysis of the indigenous languages of the Americas. As a member of the society's Historical and Literary Committee, he helped build a collection of texts that described and recorded native languages. His book on their grammatical systems (Mémoire sur le système grammatical des langues de quelques nations indiennes de l'Amérique du Nord) won the Volney Prize of the Institute of France in 1835.

In 1816, he was elected a member of the American Antiquarian Society, and in 1820, he was elected a Fellow of the American Academy of Arts and Sciences.

Du Ponceau also worked on Asian languages and was one of the first Western linguists to reject the axiomatic classification of Chinese writing as ideographic. Du Ponceau stated:
 That the Chinese system of writing is not, as has been supposed, ideographic; that its characters do not represent ideas, but words, and therefore I have called it lexigraphic.
 That ideographic writing is a creature of the imagination, and cannot exist, but for very limited purposes, which do not entitle it to the name of writing.
 That among men endowed with the gift of speech, all writing must be a direct representation of the spoken language, and cannot present ideas to the mind abstracted from it.
 That all writing, as far as we know, represents language in some of its elements, which are words, syllables, and simple sounds. In the first case it is lexigraphic, in the second syllabic, and in the third alphabetical or elementary.
He used the example of Vietnamese, then called "Cochinchinese," which used Chữ Nôm, a modified form of Chinese characters. He showed that Vietnamese used the Chinese characters to represent sound, not meaning. A hundred years later, his theory was still a source of controversy.

Death
He died on April 1, 1844 in Philadelphia, Pennsylvania and is interred at Mount Vernon Cemetery.

References

Sources

External links
 Dunglison, Robley. A public discourse in commemoration of Peter S. Du Ponceau, LL. D., late president of the American Philosophical Society: delivered before the Society pursuant to appointment, on the 25th of October, 1844. From the Digital Repository of the National Library of Medicine.
 
Works by Peter Stephen Du Ponceau, Internet Archive.

1760 births
1844 deaths
Burials at Mount Vernon Cemetery (Philadelphia)
Linguists from France
Fellows of the American Academy of Arts and Sciences
French jurists
French philosophers
French people of the American Revolution
Justices of the Louisiana Supreme Court
Pennsylvania lawyers
United States federal judges appointed by Thomas Jefferson
19th-century American judges
French male writers
Members of the American Philosophical Society
French emigrants to the United States
Members of the American Antiquarian Society
People of colonial Pennsylvania